Paweł Bolesław Graś (born 23 February 1964 in Kęty) is a Polish politician. He was elected to the Sejm on 21 October 2007, getting 35,779 votes in 12 Chrzanów district as a candidate from the Civic Platform list.

He was also a member of Sejm 1997-2001 and Sejm 2001-2005 and Sejm 2005-2007.

See also
Members of Polish Sejm 2005-2007

External links
Paweł Graś - parliamentary page - includes declarations of interest, voting record, and transcripts of speeches.

1964 births
Living people
People from Oświęcim County
Members of the Polish Sejm 2005–2007
Members of the Polish Sejm 1997–2001
Members of the Polish Sejm 2001–2005
Civic Platform politicians
Members of the Polish Sejm 2007–2011